Kayah State Government is the cabinet of Kayah State. The cabinet is led by chief minister, Zaw Myo Tin. The Government Office is on the Kanthayawaddi Road.

Cabinet (April 2016–2021)

References

State and region governments of Myanmar
Kayah State